Magic Forest is the sixth studio album by Finnish power metal band Amberian Dawn. It is the first original album to feature lead vocalist Päivi "Capri" Virkkunen.

Track listing

Personnel

Band members
Päivi "Capri" Virkkunen – vocals
Tuomas Seppälä – keyboards, guitar
Joonas Pykälä-Aho – drums
Emil "Emppu" Pohjalainen – guitars
Kimmo Korhonen – guitars

Guest/session musicians
Jukka Hoffren - bass guitar
Jens Johansson - keyboard solo on track 2
Markus Nieminen - vocals on track 8
Peter James Goodman - vocals on track 11

References

Amberian Dawn albums
2014 albums